Heliconius eleuchia, the white-edged longwing, is a species of Heliconius butterfly described by William Chapman Hewitson in 1853.

Subspecies

Subspecies include: 
 Heliconius eleuchia eleuchia - present in Costa Rica and in Colombia
 Heliconius eleuchia eleusinus Staudinger, 1885 - present in Ecuador
 Heliconius eleuchia primularis Butler, 1869 - present in C. in Ecuador

Distribution and habitat
This species is present Costa Rica, Colombia and Ecuador.

Description
These large butterflies have a slender body and long elongated front wings with a slightly concave inner edge. The basal half of the both wings is navy blue. Forewings are crossed by two yellow bands with irregular edges, running from the costal nervure to the inner angle and separating the apex from the rest of the wing. Hindwings have a large submarginal white area, crossed by black nervure. The underside presents the same ornamentation, but the forewings show a line of scarlet at the base and the hindwings have some scarlet spots in the basal area.

Biology
Caterpillars feed on Passiflora macrophyllum (Passifloraceae). The males rest on females' pupae before emergence, and mating occurs the next morning.

Müllerian mimicry 
H. eleuchia engages in Müllerian mimicry with H. cydno, specifically in Ecuador. For this type of mimicry, species adopt one another's warning signals. In this case, coloring is used to warn a predator of the unpleasant taste of their intended prey. For instance, the subspecies H. cydno alithea has two potential colorings, one of which mimics the coloring of H. eleuchia.

Bibliography
Brown, K. S. 1981 The Biology of Heliconius and Related Genera. Annual Review of Entomology 26, 427-456.
Hewitson, W. C. 1854 Illustrations of New Species of Exotic Butterflies: Selected Chiefly from the Collections of W. Wilson Saunders and William C. Hewitson. London, John Van Voorst.

References

eleuchia
Nymphalidae of South America
Butterflies described in 1853